Moudros is a town and a former municipality on the island of Lemnos, North Aegean, Greece. Since the 2011 local government reform it is part of the municipality Lemnos, of which it is a municipal unit. It covers the entire eastern peninsula of the island, with a land area of 185.127 km², covering 38.8% of the island's territory. The municipal seat was the town of Moúdros (pop. 974). Its next largest town is Kontopoúli (623). The municipal unit's total population was 3,925 in the 2011 census.

History

During the Dardanelles Campaign of the First World War, the town and its harbour were used as an Allied base, commanded by Admiral Rosslyn Wemyss. The British Empire troops used the form Mudros.

On 30 October 1918, it was the site of the signing of the Armistice of Mudros, which saw the end of hostilities between the Ottoman Empire and the Allies.

Moudros has a Commonwealth War Graves Commission (CWGC) cemetery for 148 Australian and 76 New Zealander soldiers who died during the Gallipoli Campaign.

Subdivisions
The municipal unit Moudros is subdivided into the following communities (constituent villages in brackets):
Fisini (Fisini, Agia Sofia)
Kalliopi
Kaminia (Kaminia, Voroskopos)
Kontopouli (Kontopouli, Agios Alexandros, Agios Theodoros)
Lychna (Lychna, Anemoessa)
Moudros (Moudros, Koukonisi)
Panagia (Panagia, Kortisonas)
Plaka
Repanidi (Repanidi, Kotsinos)
Roussopouli
Romanou
Skandali

References

External links
Official website Greek English

Populated places in Lemnos